CBE Software is an indie video game developer based in the Czech Republic. It was founded in 2006 as Cardboard Box Entertainment (CBE). The first released title was an adventure game Ghost in the Sheet. The studio was then inactive for a few years and its members worked on titles such as Dark Fall II: Lights Out, Barrow Hill and Tale of a Hero.

The studio was in 2011 renamed to CBE Software and became a real company. A year later it released two games – J.U.L.I.A. and J.U.L.I.A. Untold. These games were exclusively published by Lace Mamba Global who didn't pay them and the publishing agreement was cancelled. The studio came to financial troubles and so released another game Vampires!

In March 2013, the Indiegogo for J.U.L.I.A. Among the Stars (originally titled J.U.L.I.A. Enhanced Edition) was launched. The goal was $5,000 but $14,120 was raised. It was released on 12 October 2014. It is a remake of the original J.U.L.I.A. with different gameplay and story.

Games

References 

Video game companies of the Czech Republic
Video game development companies
Video game companies established in 2006
Companies based in Brno
Indie video game developers
Czech companies established in 2006